Bình Phú may refer to several rural communes in Vietnam, including:

Bình Phú, Bến Tre, a commune of Bến Tre city
Bình Phú, Quảng Ngãi, a commune of Bình Sơn District
Bình Phú, Cai Lậy District, a commune of Cai Lậy District in Tiền Giang Province
Bình Phú, Trà Vinh, a commune of Càng Long District
Bình Phú, An Giang, a commune of Châu Phú District
Bình Phú, Tuyên Quang, a commune of Chiêm Hóa District
Bình Phú, Gò Công Tây, a commune of Gò Công Tây District in Tiền Giang Province
Bình Phú, Đồng Tháp, a commune of Tân Hồng District
Bình Phú, Hanoi, a commune of Thạch Thất District
Bình Phú, Quảng Nam, a commune of Thăng Bình District